Alur may refer to:

Places in India

Andhra Pradesh
Alur, Kurnool, a mandal in Kurnool district
Alur (Assembly constituency)
Alur, a village in Anantapur district
Alur, a village in Rangareddi district 
Alur, a village in Nizamabad district

Karnataka
Alur, Hassan, a taluk in Hassan district
Alur, Bagalkot
Alur, Bellary
Alur (K.M.), a village in Belgaum district
Alur, a village in Kundapura taluk
Alur, a village in Chamarajanagar taluk
Alur, a village in Hiriyur taluk, Chitradurga district
Alur, a village in Jevargi taluk, Kalaburagi district

Kerala
Alur, Kerala, a village in Thrissur district

Maharashtra
Alur, Nanded, a panchayat village in Deglur Taluka, Nanded district
Alur, Osmanabad, a panchayat village in Umarga Tahsil, Osmanabad district

Tamil Nadu
Alur, Tamil Nadu, a town in Kanniyakumari district

Other uses
Alur people, of Uganda and the Democratic Republic of the Congo
Alur language, the language spoken by the Alur people
Mithu Alur (born 1943), disability rights activist
Rajeev Alur, professor of computer sciences at University of Pennsylvania

See also 
 Aloor (disambiguation)

Language and nationality disambiguation pages